Legionella massiliensis is a Gram-negative bacterium from the genus Legionella which was isolated from water from a cooling tower in Bouches du Rhone in France.

References

External links
Type strain of Legionella massiliensis at BacDive -  the Bacterial Diversity Metadatabase

Legionellales
Bacteria described in 2012